Ada L. Smith (born April 18, 1945) is an American former politician from New York. A Democrat, Smith served in the New York State Senate. She was convicted of misdemeanor harassment in 2006 after throwing hot coffee onto a member of her staff.

Early life and education 
Smith was born on April 18, 1945, in Amherst County, Virginia, and was raised in New York City. She graduated from Baruch College in 1973.

Career 
Smith entered politics as a Democrat, and was a deputy in the office of the City Clerk of New York City. She was a member of the New York State Senate from 1989 to 2006. Her district was centered in the Jamaica, Queens section of New York City.

Smith was the ranking minority member of the Senate's Corporations, Authorities and Commissions Committee, and gained notoriety for several brushes with the law. She was backed by her party organization in the 2006 Democratic Senate primary election but lost to challenger Shirley Huntley,  who also won the general election later that year.

Crimes and staff complaints
In 1996, Senate staffer LaSone Garland-Bryan accused Smith of menacing her with a knife while they were alone in Smith's office. According to Garland-Bryan's statement, the senator became angry when she overheard Garland-Bryan telling family members that Smith "sometimes forgot to take her medication". Garland-Bryan declined to press charges, but wrote an official complaint about the incident to then-Senate Minority Leader Martin Connor, who responded by asserting that he had "no authority" to punish Smith.

Smith faced charges in 1998 after allegedly biting the hand of a police officer in Brooklyn. She was subdued with mace by the authorities during that altercation.

In 2004, Smith refused to hand over her driver's license to authorities at a police checkpoint at a state garage in Albany; instead, she drove into the parking garage. A state trooper had to step out of the way of her oncoming vehicle. Smith's actions led to a conviction; following that conviction, then-Senate Minority Leader David Paterson removed her from a leadership post.

In 2004, a former Smith staffer, Wayne Mahlke, alleged that Smith had subjected him to verbally abusive comments relating to sexual orientation. The following year, the state's Division of Human Rights dismissed his claims due to insufficient evidence.

Smith attacked a staffer, Jennifer Jackson, on March 21, 2006 in Smith's Albany office. The senator arrived at the office following a Weight Watchers meeting that morning and mentioned that she had lost 4.3 pounds. Jackson told police that she replied, "'at the rate you go around, I would have thought you'd lose 20 pounds'". Jackson claimed that Smith cursed and threw hot coffee in her eyes. Before leaving the office, Jackson allegedly told Smith, "'Senator, you can’t do this to people. It’s abusive'". Smith allegedly pulled off Jackson's hairpiece, threw it to the floor, and said, "'If you tell anyone what happened in this office, I will f—ing kill you'". Jackson was treated for injuries to her eyes, neck, and shoulders. Smith's lawyer denied the charges and accused Jackson of lying to authorities, claiming that Jackson actually told the senator she needed to lose 100 pounds. In the aftermath of the coffee attack, then-Senate Minority Leader David Paterson stripped Smith of her state-issued car, her honorary title, and a $9,500 per year stipend attached to her leadership position. Paterson stated that the coffee attack was the latest example of what he called "a pattern of inappropriate, unprofessional and often abusive behavior" from Smith.

Smith was charged with assault in the third degree, a misdemeanor, in connection with the coffee attack on Jackson. She pleaded not guilty in Albany City Court. In August 2006, Smith was convicted of misdemeanor harassment. She was fined and ordered to attend an anger management program. Smith was also ordered to pay any medical expenses incurred by Jackson in connection with the attack that were not covered by insurance.

In 2006, The New York Times reported that tabloids referred to Smith as "'the Wild Woman of Albany'".

References

		

Democratic Party New York (state) state senators
New York (state) politicians convicted of crimes
Women state legislators in New York (state)
African-American state legislators in New York (state)
African-American women in politics
Living people
1945 births
People from Amherst County, Virginia
Baruch College alumni
21st-century African-American people
21st-century African-American women
20th-century African-American people
20th-century African-American women